Heather Evelyn Joshi,  ( Spooner; born 21 April 1946) is a British academic, economist, and demographer. She is Emeritus Professor of Economic and Developmental Demography at the University of London. She was Director of the Centre for Longitudinal Studies from 2003 to 2010.

Early life and education
Joshi was born on 21 April 1946 to Guy Malcolm Spooner and Molly Spooner; her parents were both biologists. She went to school in Devon, England. She studied politics, philosophy and economics at St Hilda's College, Oxford, graduating with a Bachelor of Arts (BA) degree in 1967: as was traditional, her BA was later promoted to a Master of Arts (MA Oxon) degree. She undertook postgraduate studies in economics at St Antony's College, Oxford, graduating with a Master of Letters (MLitt) degree in 1970.

Academic career
Joshi began her career as a junior research officer at the Institute of Economics and Statistics, University of Oxford (1969 to 1973), and an economic advisor with the Government Economic Service (1973 to 1979). She then joined the Centre for Population Studies at the London School of Hygiene and Tropical Medicine (LSHTM), working as a research fellow (1979 to 1983) and senior research fellow (1983 to 1988). She moved to the Department of Economics of Birkbeck College, London, where she was a senior research fellow from 1987/1988 to 1990. She then returned to LSHTM where she had been appointed a senior lecturer.

From 1993 to 1998, she was Professor of Social Statistics at City University London. In 1994, she was appointed Deputy Director of the Centre for Longitudinal Studies. From 2000 to 2011, she was director of the United Kingdom's Millennium Cohort Study. In 2003, she was promoted to Director of the Centre for Longitudinal Studies, and served in that role until 2010. She has been a research professor at the Institute of Education of University College, London since 2016.

Personal life
In 1969, she married Vijay Joshi: they divorced in 1977. In 1982, she married for a second time to Gregory Hans David Martin. Together they had two children and step children from previous marriages.

Honours
In 2000, Joshi was elected Fellow of the British Academy (FBA). In the 2015 New Year Honours, she was appointed Commander of the Order of the British Empire (CBE) 'for services to Longitudinal and Women's Studies'.

Works

References

1946 births
Living people
Academics of the University of London
Fellows of the British Academy
Commanders of the Order of the British Empire
British economists
British women economists
British demographers
Alumni of St Hilda's College, Oxford
Alumni of St Antony's College, Oxford
Academics of the University of Oxford
Civil servants in HM Treasury
Academics of the London School of Hygiene & Tropical Medicine
Academics of Birkbeck, University of London